The 2013 Ligue 1 season was the 50th of the competition of the first-tier football in Senegal and the fifth professional season.  The tournament was organized by the Senegalese Football Federation.  The season began on 13 January and finished earlier on 19 August and it was a season that competed through a single year.  It was the fifth season labelled as a "League" ("Ligue" in French).  Diambars FC won their only title, and a year later would compete in the 2014 CAF Champions League.  ASC Diaraf the winner of the 2013 Senegalese Cup participated in the 2014 CAF Confederation Cup the following season.

Overview
The season would have feature 16 clubs, this time the winner would be decided on a club with the highest number of points after all thirty matches had been finished.  The clubs would be reduced to 14 in the following season as four clubs were relegated in the season.  The season had a total of 240 matches, 385 goals were scored in the season, almost double than the previous season.  Diambars scored the highest 42 goals, the lowest scored was ASC Assur.

US Ouakam again was the defending team of the title.

It was the only time as two clubs shared the same results and were Niarry Tarry and Touré Kunda Foot-Pro, they finished 8th place.

Participating clubs

 NGB ASC Niarry Tally
 Diambars FC
 AS Douanes
 ASC Yeggo
 Dakar Université Club
 ASC Linguère
 ASC Assur
 ASC Touré Kunda

 ASC Diaraf
 ASC Port Autonome
 Olympique de Ngor
 Casa Sport
 US Ouakam
 US Gorée
 AS Pikine
 Guédiawaye FC

Information about the clubs

Overview
The league was contested by 16 teams.

League standings

References

External links
 2013 Senegalese season at RSSSF
 Standings at FIFA site

Senegal
Senegal Premier League seasons